Batocera celebiana is a species of beetle in the family Cerambycidae. It was described by Thomson in 1858. It is known from Java, the Moluccas, and Sulawesi. It contains the subspecies Batocera celebiana pierrotae.

Varieties
 Batocera celebiana var. biflavomaculata Breuning, 1950
 Batocera celebiana var. bivittata Breuning, 1950
 Batocera celebiana var. eurydice Thomson
 Batocera celebiana var. metallescens Pascoe
 Batocera celebiana var. tucana Kriesche

References

Batocerini
Beetles described in 1858